Pollichia campestris, commonly known as waxberry or barley sugar bush, is a herbaceous plant in the family Caryophyllaceae and the only species in the monotypic genus Pollichia. It is found in southern and eastern Africa and in the Arabian peninsula.

Taxonomy
Pollichia campestris was first described in 1789 by the Scottish botanist William Aiton in the publication Hortus Kewensis, a catalogue of all the plants then being cultivated at Kew Gardens.

Description
The erect stems have a covering of fine hairs when young. The inflorescence is a small, pubescent cyme growing in the axil of a leaf; the flowers are greenish-yellow with white bracts. The fruit is a capsule with a persistent receptacle and calyx, and the bracts become swollen and fleshy, waxy-white or dull orange.

Distribution and habitat
Pollichia campestris is native to the Arabian peninsula, eastern Africa and southern Africa. Its range extends from Saudi Arabia and Yemen, through Eritrea and southwards in East Africa to Angola, Namibia, Zimbabwe and South Africa.

Ecology
This is a common plant throughout much of Africa. It often forms part of the subcanopy in the Kalahari thornveld region of South Africa, but in Botswana it often grows in more open habitats. The fruits are attractive to birds and the seeds of this species are dispersed by them. The fruits are also eaten by people, the foliage is browsed by animals and the plant is used in traditional medicine to treat rheumatism and chest problems.

References

Caryophyllaceae
Flora of South Africa
Monotypic Caryophyllaceae genera